Maximos Margunios (b.1549 Candia, Crete - d. 1602, Venice) Bishop of Cerigo (Kythira), was a Greek Renaissance humanist. He was a teacher at the Greek school in Venice and noted Patriarch Cyril Lucaris was among his students, Margunios was a supporter of ecclesiastical Union with Rome and wrote on the theology of the procession of the Holy Spirit. Margunios was also noted for his charitable and moderate views on the Latin Church.

He is also known for writing poetry and publishing some first editions of Greek and Byzantine texts in the Latin language, such as works of John Chrysostom. He also corresponded with a large number of humanists in Western European countries like England, France and Italy; especially those based in Tübingen, Germany, e.g. Martin Crusius.

Known works
Three Books Concerning the Procession of the Holy Ghost
Arguments against the Latins
Dialogue between a Greek and a Latin

References

See also
Greek scholars in the Renaissance

1549 births
1602 deaths
Greek Renaissance humanists
Kingdom of Candia
16th-century Greek people
Kythira
Clergy from Heraklion
Writers from Heraklion
16th-century Greek educators